Major-General Charles Howard Foulkes, CB, CMG, DSO (1 February 1875 – 6 May 1969) was a Royal Engineers officer in the British Army and also a British international field hockey player who competed in the 1908 Summer Olympics in the bronze medal-winning team. He saw service in World War I and, following the first German use of gas on 22 April 1915 at the Second Battle of Ypres, became Britain's chief advisor on gas warfare. He also advised on the use of gas to suppress the uprisings in Afghanistan (1919) and Waziristan (1920), but gas was never actually deployed in these conflicts.

Military career
Foulkes was educated at Bedford Modern School, and was commissioned into the Royal Engineers as a second lieutenant on 27 February 1894, followed by promotion to lieutenant on 27 February 1897. He served in Sierra Leone 1898–99 (later known as the Hut Tax War), for which he received the East and West Africa Medal. After the outbreak of the Second Boer War in October 1899, he was appointed on the Staff of the army in South Africa, and took part in a number of engagements and operations. He became Assistant Commissioner for the Anglo-French Boundary Commission in the East of Niger in late 1902, with the local rank of captain. After taking part in the Kano-Sokoto expedition which brought the Emirs in Nigeria under British control in 1903, he became Commander of the Ordnance Survey of Scotland in 1904. He was a member of the bronze medal-winning team for the field hockey in the 1908 Summer Olympics. He went on to be Commander of 31st (Fortress) Company in Ceylon in 1909 and Commander of 'L' Company at the Royal Engineers Depot in Chatham in 1913.

Foulkes served in World War I as Commander of 11th (Field) Company, taking part in the First Battle of Ypres in 1914 before becoming Britain's chief advisor on gas warfare in 1915 and General Officer Commanding the Special Brigade responsible for Chemical Warfare and Director of Gas Services in 1917.

He advised on the use of gas to suppress the uprisings in Afghanistan in 1919 and Waziristan in 1920, although gas was never actually deployed in these conflicts, before becoming Commander Royal Engineers in Fermoy and Director of Irish Propaganda in 1921. He went on to be Commander, Royal Engineers in Northumbria in 1922, Deputy Chief Engineer at Southern Command in 1924 and Chief Engineer at Aldershot Command in 1926 before retiring in 1930.

Publications

Foulkes, C.H., Commonsense and ARP, a practical guide for householders and business managers (C Arthur Pearson, London, 1939)

References

External links
 

1875 births
1969 deaths
British Army major generals
Royal Engineers officers
British Army personnel of the Second Boer War
British Army personnel of World War I
British military personnel of the Third Anglo-Afghan War
British military personnel of the Irish War of Independence
British male field hockey players
Scottish male field hockey players
Olympic field hockey players of Great Britain
Field hockey players at the 1908 Summer Olympics
Olympic bronze medallists for Great Britain
British military personnel of the Waziristan Campaign
British military personnel of the Kano-Sokoto Expedition
Olympic medalists in field hockey
People educated at Bedford Modern School
Medalists at the 1908 Summer Olympics
Scottish Olympic medallists